, also known as Mikohidari Tadaie, was a Japanese statesman, courtier, politician, poet and calligrapher during the Heian period.

In 1090 he ordained as a Buddhist monk and undertook the precepts a year later. He died several months later.

Career at court
He was a minister during the reigns of Emperor Go-Reizei, Emperor Shirakawa and Emperor Horikawa.

Tadaie did well at court, rising to the Senior Second Rank and the office of Dainagon (Major Counselor).

Poet
In this period of Japanese history, the duties of Imperial courtiers included an expectation that each would create and present poems.

An incident from Tadaie's life is featured in a poem which captured a fleeting moment and a gallant gesture:

Calligrapher
Examples of calligraphy attributable to Tadaie are identified variously by the Japanese government as a "National Treasure", as an "Important Art Object" and as an "Important Cultural Property".

Genealogy
Tadaie's grandfather was Fujiwara no Michinaga; and his father was Fujiwara no Nagaie.  The son of Tadaie was Fujiwara no Toshitada (1071–1123). This lineage was identified as the Mikohidari lineage within the Hokke branch of the Fujiwara clan.

Tadaie was the grandfather of the poet Fujiwara no Toshinari (1114–1204), who was also known as Shunzei. Tadaie was the great-grandfather of Fujiwara no Sadaie, also known as Fujiwara no Teika.

Notes

References
 Porter, William N. (1909). A Hundred Verses from Old Japan, Being a Translation of the Hyaku-nin-isshiu. Oxford: Oxford University Press. 
 Sato, Hiroaki. (2008). Japanese Women Poets: an Anthology.  Armonk, New York: M.E. Sharpe.; 

1033 births
1091 deaths
Fujiwara clan
People of Heian-period Japan
Heian period Buddhist clergy